Red Pottage is a 1918 British silent drama film directed by Meyrick Milton and starring C. Aubrey Smith, Mary Dibley and Gerald Ames. It is an adaptation of the 1899 novel Red Pottage by Mary Cholmondeley.

Cast
 C. Aubrey Smith - Lord Newhaven
 Mary Dibley - Lady Newhaven
 Gerald Ames - Hugh Scarlett
 E. Holman Clark - Bishop
 Marjorie Hume - Rachel West

References

External links
 

1918 films
British drama films
British silent feature films
Films directed by Meyrick Milton
1918 drama films
Films based on British novels
Ideal Film Company films
British black-and-white films
1910s English-language films
1910s British films
Silent drama films